Armando Martínez (28 December 1931 – 7 June 1969) was a Mexican cyclist. He competed in the team time trial at the 1960 Summer Olympics.

References

External links
 

1931 births
1969 deaths
Mexican male cyclists
Olympic cyclists of Mexico
Cyclists at the 1960 Summer Olympics
Sportspeople from Michoacán
People from Zacapu
20th-century Mexican people